Alfredo Santos is an American actor, producer and former model. Born in New York City, Santos studied Sciences at Hunter College. He is best known for playing the character of Johnny Bishop in the WB TV series Grosse Pointe.

Career
He was a model from 1991 until 2002.

Model career
In 1991, when he was 15, Santos was discovered by Ford Modeling Agency. They then signed him to be the face of Versace. He has modelled clothing for top fashion names such as  Armani, Valentino, and Abercrombie & Fitch.
He has also featured on the covers of magazines: Seventeen, YM, Teen Vogue, American Fitness, and Elle.

Acting career
Santos is known for his character 'Dante Belasco' in Jeepers Creepers 2, and also had starring roles in the television series The Help and Grosse Pointe. He also made guest appearances on CSI: NY. Santos is also starring in the upcoming horror film Speed Demons, alongside Sticky Fingaz, Marina Sirtis, Terry Kiser and Angela Sarafyan, directed by Dan García.

Santos is the president and founder of Stronghold Productions, Inc, an entertainment film company in Beverly Hills, California.

Personal life 
He is the brother of Chris Santos and Patrick Santos, who are also actors.

Filmography

Film

Television

References

External links

 
 Interview about Grosse Pointe

1976 births
Living people
American male television actors
American male film actors
American film producers
American male models
American television personalities
Hunter College alumni
American male writers
Place of birth missing (living people)